Tell Ain Sofar is an archaeological site 2  km south of Muallaka, southwest of Zahle in the Mohafazat (Governorate) of Beqaa, in Lebanon. It dates back at least to the Early Bronze Age.

References

Baalbek District
Bronze Age sites in Lebanon